A list of films produced by the Marathi language film industry based in Maharashtra in the year 1986.

1986 Releases
A list of Marathi films released in 1986.

References

Lists of 1986 films by country or language
 Marathi
1986